Iaras is a municipality in the state of São Paulo in Brazil. The population is 9,517 (2020 est.) in an area of 401 km². The elevation is 648 m.

References

Municipalities in São Paulo (state)